Epantius is a genus of darkling beetles in the family Tenebrionidae. There is one described species in Epantius, E. obscurus.

References

Further reading

 

Tenebrioninae
Articles created by Qbugbot